Phryctoria was a semaphore system used in Ancient Greece. The phryctoriae were towers built on selected mountaintops so that one tower (phryctoria) would be visible to the next tower (usually 20 miles away). The towers were used for the transmission of a specific prearranged message. Flames were lit on one tower and then the next tower in succession also lit flames.

In Aeschylus tragedy Agamemnon, a slave watchman character learns the news of Troy's fall from Mycenae by carefully watching a fire beacon. Thucydides wrote that during the Peloponnesian War, the Peloponnesians who were in Corcyra were informed by night-time beacon signals of the approach of sixty Athenian vessels from Lefkada.

Phryctoriae and Pyrseia

Ιn the 2nd century BC, the Greek engineers from Alexandria, Cleoxenes and Democletus invented the pyrseia. Πυρσεία from πυρσός which means torch.
The letters of the Greek alphabet were listed on a table. Each letter corresponded to a row and a column on the table. By using two groups of torches (five torches in every group), the left indicating the row and the right the column of the table, they could send a message by defining a specific letter  through combination of light torches. 

The coding system was as follows:

	

When they wanted to send the letter O (omicron), they fired five torches on the right set and three torches on the left set.

See also 
 Byzantine beacon system
 Optical communication
 Polybius square
 Greek hydraulic semaphore system

References

External links
 The Medean Wars - Part II

Ancient Greek technology
Ancient Greek military terminology
Ancient Greek military equipment
Communications in Greece
History of telecommunications
Signalling lights
Beacons
Semaphore